The 2019–20 Genoa C.F.C. season was the club's thirteenth consecutive season in Serie A. The club competed in Serie A, and was eliminated in the round of 16 in the Coppa Italia.

Former Roma and Empoli coach Aurelio Andreazzoli was hired to replace coach Cesare Prandelli on 14 June 2019.

The 2019-2020 season for Genoa was a challenging one, as the team found themselves embroiled in a relegation battle for the majority of the campaign. The team finished in 17th place in the Serie A standings, just one point above the drop zone, and narrowly avoided relegation to Serie B.

The season started off on a positive note as Genoa secured a 3-1 victory over Roma in their opening fixture, but things quickly turned sour as they failed to win any of their next seven matches. The team struggled to find consistency throughout the season, with their defense in particular proving to be a weakness. They conceded a total of 64 goals over the course of the campaign, the second-highest total in the league.

Despite their struggles, there were a few bright spots for Genoa during the 2019-2020 season. Striker Andrea Pinamonti emerged as a key player for the team, scoring seven goals in 26 league appearances. Midfielder Lasse Schöne also made a positive impact after joining the club from Ajax in the summer. In addition, the team showed resilience in the latter stages of the season, picking up important wins over the likes of Sampdoria and Lecce to secure their Serie A status.

Players

Squad information
Appearances include league matches only

Transfers

In

Loans in

Out

Loans out

Pre-season and friendlies

Competitions

Serie A

League table

Results summary

Results by round

Matches

Coppa Italia

Statistics

Appearances and goals

|-
! colspan=14 style=background:#dcdcdc; text-align:center| Goalkeepers

|-
! colspan=14 style=background:#dcdcdc; text-align:center| Defenders

|-
! colspan=14 style=background:#dcdcdc; text-align:center| Midfielders

|-
! colspan=14 style=background:#dcdcdc; text-align:center| Forwards

|-
! colspan=14 style=background:#dcdcdc; text-align:center| Players transferred out during the season

Goalscorers

Last updated: 9 February 2020

Clean sheets

Last updated: 9 February 2020

Disciplinary record

Last updated: 9 February 2020

References

Genoa C.F.C. seasons
Genoa